is an interchange railway station in Naka-ku, Nagoya, Aichi Prefecture, Japan, operated by Central Japan Railway Company (JR Tōkai)  and the Transportation Bureau City of Nagoya.

Lines
The above-ground portion off Tsurumai Station is served by the Chūō Main Line, and is located 391.3 kilometers from the starting point of the line at Tokyo Station and 5.6 kilometers from Nagoya Station. the underground portion of the station is served by the Tsurumai Line of the Nagoya Municipal Subway and is 9.7 kilometers from the starting point of that line at Kami-Otai Station.

JR Central

Layout
The JR station has two elevated opposed side platforms with the station building underneath. The station building has automated ticket machines, TOICA automated turnstiles and a staffed ticket office. There are two wickets, the Nagoya University Hospital Wicket and the Tsurumai Park Wicket.  There are handicapped-accessible bathrooms with a baby-changing area, and there are rest areas. Outside JR Tsurumai is a Doutor Coffee shop.

Platforms

Nagoya Municipal Subway

Layout
The underground portion of the station has two opposed side platforms. The station building has automated ticket machines, Manaca automated turnstiles and a staffed ticket office.

Platforms

Station history

Adjacent stations

!colspan=5|JR Central

Passenger statistics
In fiscal 2017, the JR portion of the station was used by an average of 19,892 passengers daily and theNagoya Subway portion of the station by 14,234 passengers daily

Surrounding area
 Nagoya University Hospital
 Tsuruma Central Library

See also
 List of Railway Stations in Japan

References

External links 
 
JR Tokai official home page
 Nagoya Subway official home page

Railway stations in Japan opened in 1937
Railway stations in Japan opened in 1977
Railway stations in Aichi Prefecture
Chūō Main Line
Stations of Central Japan Railway Company
Railway stations in Nagoya